Lucyna is a moth genus of the family Depressariidae.

Species
 Lucyna fenestella (Zeller, 1874)
 Lucyna trifida Beéche, 2012

References

Depressariinae